Desulfovibrio aespoeensis  is a mesophilic and sulfate-reducing bacterium from the genus of Desulfovibrio which has been isolated from groundwater from the Äspö Hard Rock Laboratory in Sweden.

References

External links
Type strain of Desulfovibrio aespoeensis at BacDive -  the Bacterial Diversity Metadatabase	

Bacteria described in 1998
Desulfovibrio